UOC may refer to:
 Ukrainian Orthodox Church (disambiguation)
 Universitat Oberta de Catalunya
 University of Chicago
 University of Crete
 University of Cambridge
 University of Cumbria
 University of Cincinnati
 University of Colombo
 University of Calgary

See also 
 UoC (disambiguation)